The Chief of the General Staff (German: Chef des Generalstabes der Armee) of the Bavarian army was the military leader of the armed forces in the Kingdom of Bavaria.

Names of the General Staff of the Army commanders 
 Generalquartiermeister (Quartermaster General, from 1792 to 1805)
 Chef des Generalstabes (from 1805 to 1822)
 Chef des Generalquartiermeisterstabes (Chief of the Quartermaster General Staff,  from 1822 to 1840)
 Generalquartiermeister (from 1840 to 1878, after 1883 also inspector of military training institutions)
 Chef des Generalstabes der Armee (after 1878)

General Staff of the Bavarian Army 
Originally the General Staff (German: Generalstab) of the Bavarian army was created by prince-elector Charles Theodore, Elector of Bavaria on demand of Sir Benjamin Thompson, Count Rumford in 1792. In 1822 it was renamed under Maximilian I Joseph of Bavaria to Generalquartiermeister. During the reign of Ludwig II of Bavaria, it was renamed once more to Generalstab. The office of the Chief of the General Staff was located in Munich. The General Staff of the army supported the supreme command of the army, and was point of contact for the Truppengeneralstäbe (general staffs of troops), the general staffs of the divisional commands, which were created after 1826, abolished in 1837 and once more deployed in 1847. The General Staff followed the mobile forces on mission, until the Bavarian army was subordinated in case of war to the command of the German Emperor in his function as Bundesfeldherr (federal commander) after 1870. Due to this the commanders of the Bavarian army were under the direct command of the central German military authorities  during World War I; on mobilisation most of the Bavarian General Staff became the headquarters of the largely Bavarian 6th Army, with some officers joining the Supreme Army Command.

References 

Military of Bavaria